Malo Ubeljsko is a small village below the eastern slopes of the Nanos Plateau in the Municipality of Postojna in the Inner Carniola region of Slovenia.

Name
Together with neighboring Veliko Ubeljsko (literally, 'big Ubeljsko'), Malo Ubeljsko (literally, 'little Ubeljsko') was mentioned in written sources circa 1200 as ze Vlbelzch (and as Vbelczk in 1402, Vlbliczk and Vbelicz in 1485, and Vbelskh in 1498). The name may be derived from the common noun *ǫbъlъ '(deep) spring'; there are several major springs in the area.

References

External links

Malo Ubeljsko on Geopedia

Populated places in the Municipality of Postojna